Maiwa language may refer to:
 Maiwa language (Papuan)
 Maiwa language (Sulawesi)